Paracapperia is a genus of moths in the family Pterophoridae.

Species
Paracapperia anatolicus (Caradja, 1920)
Paracapperia esuriens (Meyrick, 1932)

Oxyptilini
Moth genera